Sultan Haji Ahmad Shah Hospital, formerly known as Hospital Temerloh, is a 650-bed government-funded multi-specialty hospital located in the district of Temerloh in the state of Pahang, Malaysia. It is centrally located along the Kuala Lumpur-Kuantan Highway on a  piece of land.

History
The construction of the hospital was originally mooted to replace Hospital Mentakab which was over a century old. The hospital was to serve the growing healthcare needs of not only the district of Temerloh, but as a referral centre for Kuala Lipis, Raub, Maran, Bentong, Jerantut and Bera.

Construction of the hospital began in June 2002 and was completed on 15 January 2005, in a record period of 34 months. The cost of construction was RM480 million. Various healthcare services of the hospital were started in stages between March 2005 and 16 April 2005.

The hospital was officially opened by Sultan Haji Ahmad Shah of Pahang on 27 March 2006. The name change from Hospital Temerloh to Hospital Sultan Haji Ahmad Shah was in recognition of the Sultan's graciousness in consenting to the launch.

The paediatric daycare ward was refurbished in 2007 by Amway.

References

External links
 Official Website

Hospital buildings completed in 2005
Hospitals in Pahang
Hospitals established in 2005
Temerloh District